Match Day may refer to:

 Match Day (series), a football video game franchise
 Match Day (video game), a football computer game, the first in the series
 Match Day (medicine), the day the United States' National Resident Matching Program announces medical residency placements for medical students
 Matchday programme, a British and Irish sporting tradition